Sense and Sensibility and Sea Monsters (2009) is a parody novel by Ben H. Winters, with Jane Austen credited as co-author. It is a mashup story containing elements from Jane Austen's 1811 novel Sense and Sensibility and common tropes from sea monster stories. It is the thematic sequel to another 2009 novel from the same publisher called Pride and Prejudice and Zombies.  It was first published by Quirk Books on September 15, 2009.

Plot summary

The story follows the plot of Sense and Sensibility, but places the novel in an alternate universe version of Regency era United Kingdom where an event known as “The Alteration” has turned the creatures of the sea against mankind. In addition, this unexplained event spawns numerous “sea monsters,” including sea serpents, giant lobsters, and man-eating jellyfish.

The wealthy Henry Dashwood lives on his estate, Norland Park, with his second wife and their three daughters - Elinor, Marianne, and Margaret. Dashwood embarks on a journey to discover the source of The Alteration, but is attacked by a hammerhead shark and killed. Upon his death the estate passes not to Mrs. Dashwood and her daughters but rather to Mr. Dashwood's son John, the child of his first wife.

Before expiring from his shark wounds, the elder Dashwood asks John to take care of his stepmother and half-sisters. John initially agrees to do so but is soon influenced by his greedy wife Fanny into giving the girls nothing at all. John and Fanny move into Norland, prompting the scorned Dashwood women to seek living space elsewhere.

Mrs. Dashwood's cousin Sir John Middleton invites her to stay at a cottage situated on an archipelago off the coast of Devonshire. Although Devonshire is considered to have England's highest concentration of sea monsters, Mrs. Dashwood accepts the offer and the four women relocate to a windswept shanty known as Barton Cottage. Here they are treated kindly by Sir John, who invites them to dine at his heavily fortified manor house on nearby Deadwind Island. They are soon introduced to Sir John's family and friends, including his wife (a former island princess whom Sir John kidnapped and carried back to Britain and makes an escape attempt every couple of weeks), her mother (also kidnapped by Sir John and now calling herself “Mrs. Jennings”), and Colonel Brandon, a quiet and reserved gentleman who is also a part-man, part-squid mutant.

The move to Barton Cottage serves to separate Elinor from Fanny's brother Edward Ferrars. The unassuming and somewhat unremarkable Edward is clearly attracted to Elinor, and she to him, but Fanny makes it clear that their wealthy mother would never tolerate a marriage between Edward and the poor Elinor, insisting instead that he be married off to a woman of high rank and great wealth. Edward visits Elinor at Norland just before the move, and his reserved behavior makes her wonder if he is truly interested in her. His subsequent failure to visit her at her new island home only reinforces this suspicion.

In contrast to Elinor's woes, Marianne soon finds two suitors. Colonel Brandon is smitten with her, but she finds his age (35) and his tentacle-covered face to be repulsive. While out for a walk, Marianne falls into a rain-swollen creek and is attacked by an octopus. She is saved by the handsome John Willoughby, a dashing adventurer and deep-sea diver who has come to the archipelago to visit his aunt. The two of them are soon inseparable and Elinor begins to suspect that the two are planning on getting engaged. Unfortunately for Marianne, Willoughby is suddenly called away to the undersea city of Sub-Marine Station Beta, leaving her heartbroken and alone.

Edward Ferrars finally pays a visit to the Dashwoods at Barton Cottage, but his continued unhappiness and reserved nature lead Elinor to decide that he no longer has feelings for her. Given her mother's sorrow at being banished to the forlorn Devonshire coast and Marianne's sorrow at being abandoned by Willoughby, Elinor decides that she must hide her own sorrow for the good of the family.

Elinor is soon dealt a double shock when Lady Middleton's cousins, Anne and Lucy Steele, come to visit. While out rowing, Elinor and Lucy are attacked by a fearsome sea serpent known as the Devonshire Fang-Beast, and the two barely escape with their lives. In the middle of the desperate struggle, Lucy informs Elinor that she has been engaged to Edward for more than four years.  Elinor again hides her true feelings and wishes Lucy the best; secretly, she believes that Edward is only engaged to Lucy out of a sense of honor and duty and hopes for the two of them to somehow break the engagement.

To cheer up the two elder Dashwood sisters, Mrs. Jennings offers to take them to Sub-Marine Station Beta. (There was an earlier Sub-Marine Station Alpha located in the Irish Sea, but it was destroyed by a treacherous merman.) The Station is a massive iron and glass undersea dome housing a large city, public gardens, shops, and a research laboratory where scientists plot new ways to defeat their aquatic enemies. Here Marianne attempts to renew her courtship with Willoughby, only to find him cold and unresponsive to her advances.  When Willoughby leaves Marianne to fend for herself against an attack of giant lobsters, she demands an answer from him, and gets one: she learns that he is engaged to the very wealthy Miss Grey, news which leaves Marianne devastated. She admits to Elinor that she and Willoughby were never officially engaged, but his attentions towards her led her to believe that he loved her and would eventually marry her.

Meanwhile, the truth about Willoughby's real character starts to emerge; Colonel Brandon tells Elinor that Willoughby had seduced Brandon's ward, fifteen-year-old Eliza Williams, and then abandoned her in a most cruel way - playfully burying her up to her neck in sand, then leaving her. Colonel Brandon was once in love with Miss Williams' mother, a woman who resembled Marianne and whose life was destroyed by an unhappy arranged marriage to the Colonel's brother.

The Steele sisters arrive at Sub-Marine Station Beta along with John and Fanny Dashwood, Edward, and Edward's mother.  Lucy is overjoyed when Edward's mother prefers her to Elinor, but her happiness is soon ruined when Anne lets it slip that Edward and Lucy are engaged. Edward is immediately disinherited and his fortune passes to his brother; however, Elinor and her friends respect Edward's choice of love and honor over money. Colonel Brandon offers Edward a modest income as a lighthouse keeper to help him get started on a new life.

The vacation at Sub-Marine Station Beta is abruptly ended when schools of swordfish begin ramming the glass dome in the hopes of breaking it.  They eventually succeed with the help of a narwhal and other sea creatures; the Dashwood sisters and their friends barely manage to escape before the dome breaks and floods. While riding an emergency ferry to the surface, Elinor encounters Edward's brother Robert and is disheartened to see that Robert cares more for his newfound inheritance than for the fate of his brother.

The sisters and Mrs. Jennings retire to the Cleveland, a houseboat owned by Mrs. Jennings’ son-in-law (and Sir John's fellow mercenary) Mr. Palmer. Soon after arriving, a depressed Marianne is attacked by mosquitoes and develops malaria.  The Palmers leave for their own safety, and only after they are gone does Elinor realize the sudden danger they are in; the area around the Cleveland is home to the bloodthirsty Pirate Dreadbeard, and Dreadbeard's friendship with Mr. Palmer is the only thing keeping them safe.  Without Palmer, the Cleveland and the Dashwood sisters are at the mercy of the pirates.  As Marianne is deathly ill and unable to move, Colonel Brandon volunteers to swim to Barton Cottage and return with Mrs. Dashwood.  This leaves Elinor and Mrs. Jennings to defend the Cleveland.

Hearing of Marianne's illness, Willoughby journeys to the Cleveland and helps Elinor booby-trap the vessel; he also explains that when torn between love of Marianne and the lure of Miss Grey's wealth, he chose the latter and was deeply regretful about it.  Willoughby departs just as Pirate Dreadbeard and his men arrive. Elinor and Mrs. Jennings bravely defend their ship, and Elinor summons a swarm of octopodes using a special whistle that she has obtained from Willoughby. Dreadbeard's men are soon massacred by the tentacled monsters, while the Pirate himself is killed by the returning Colonel Brandon.

Marianne recovers from her malaria.  Elinor passes along Willoughby's confession, and Marianne admits that she could never have been truly happy being married to such a selfish man.  She points out that the combination of her wish for death and her deadly illness was morally equivalent to attempting suicide, and resolves to model herself after Elinor.

A servant reports to the Dashwoods that Mr. Ferrars has married Lucy. Elinor is overcome by pain and visions of a five-pointed star; upon reflection, she realizes that the pain and visions have been with her (and always appear most forcefully) whenever Lucy is around. Sir John surmises that Lucy must be a sea witch - a monster that seduces human men and sucks the marrow from its victim's bones. Before Elinor can form a plan to save Edward, he arrives at Barton Cottage.  The Dashwoods learn that it was Robert Ferrars, not Edward, that married Lucy.  They resolve to leave Robert to his terrible fate.

The happy occasion is literally upended when the island upon which Barton Cottage rests suddenly rises from the ocean; it turns out to be not an island at all, but rather a monstrous sea-beast known as Leviathan, awakened from a long slumber and hungry for all sorts of marine life.

The characters survive their sudden upheaval from their former island home. Edward reconciles with his mother and asks Elinor to marry him; and she agrees. The couple begin a simple new life tending to the lighthouse at Delaford. Marianne resolves to become a marine engineer so that she can design a new Sub-Marine Station Gamma dome.  Despite herself, she comes to fall in love with Colonel Brandon, and the two eventually marry.  Willoughby, somewhat to his dismay, is forgiven by his aunt for his treatment of Eliza and reclaims his inheritance. He realizes that had he married Marianne for love instead of Miss Grey for money, he would have eventually attained both love and money. Instead he is left to ponder what might have been.

Promotion

The novel was initially announced via a YouTube video on 13 July 2009; it has had over 400,000 views since it was uploaded. It features cover art similar to its predecessor—in that it appears to take a work of art and transform it into the theme of the novel. However, with Sense and Sensibility and Sea Monsters, the image is created by the artist.

Reception

Entertainment Weekly gave Sense and Sensibility and Sea Monsters a rating of B− (in contrast to a rating of A− for Pride and Prejudice and Zombies), wondering "(c)an it be that in the rush to turn a charming book novelty into a renewable resource, the whole Austen-and-monsters series has already jumped the shark?"

The A.V. Club gave the novel a favorable review and a grade of A−, approving of Winters' "aggressive approach to transforming his assigned text into horror" and commenting that "instead of destroying the integrity of Austen’s subtle romance, Winters’ mysterious chanting natives, sea-witch curses, and undersea habitats move the story into a gothic realm".

New York Magazine gave the novel a mixed review, stating that "It’s hard to say, in the end, if this is an homage, an exploitation, a deconstruction, or just a 300-page parlor trick. Although the sea-monster subplots, considered independently, rarely rise above pulp clichés, the book’s best moments do achieve a kind of bizarro symbiosis."

The novel is the subject of literary analysis in the 2019 collection of essays, Jane Austen and Comedy. In an essay in the book, Misty Krueger argues for the value of the monster mashup as a form of Austen adaptation. Krueger states that readers should "have fun with Sea Monsters’ incongruous, carnivalesque doppelgangers and then...revisit Sense and Sensibility" to learn more about Austen's characters.

See also

Pride and Prejudice and Zombies

References
Notes

Bibliography

External links

2009 American novels
Adaptations of works by Jane Austen
American alternate history novels
American comedy novels
Parody novels
Novels set in Devon
Quirk Books books
Sense and Sensibility